The 99th Infantry Regiment (French – 99e régiment d'infanterie or 99e RI) was an infantry regiment of the French Army. It was originally formed in 1796 as the 24th Light Demi-Brigade, which was renamed the 44th Light Infantry Regiment and finally (in 1855) the 99th Infantry Regiment. It disbanded in 1997.

It kept the traditions of the 44th Light Infantry Regiment as well as reviving the traditions and battle honours of the previous 99th Infantry Regiment which had merged into another regiment in 1803. Its motto was Ne Pas Subir and its marching song Au vieux 99, au vieux 99, tire au cul tu seras bien vu, tire au flanc tu seras content.

History
It was originally formed as the 24th Light Demi-Brigade in May 1796 and sent on the 1797 expédition d'Irlande, in which two of its three troopships were wrecked, drowning 705 men. Augustin Pons (1774–1854) served in the 2nd formation then in 24th Light Infantry Regiment, rising from corporal to lieutenant. The unit served in 1797 at Neuwied and Neuhof, in 1800 in the crossing of the Grand-Saint-Bernard, Marengo, Marcaria, Pozzolo and the siege of Verona. It was renamed the 24th Light Infantry Regiment in 1803, fighting at Nordlingen and Austerlitz in 1805, Jena in 1806, Eylau, Lomitten, Heilsberg and Friedland in 1807 and  Abensberg, Eckmühl, Ratisbonne, Wagram and Essling in 1809. It took part in the French invasion of Russia and the subsequent retreat, including Borodino, Dresden, Leipzig and Brienne before finally being disbanded in 1814.

The regiment was re-formed in 1840 and took part in suppressing the June Days in Paris from 23 to 26 June 1848. It was renumbered as the 99th Infantry Regiment in 1855 and soon afterwards took part in the conquest of Algeria from 1855 to 1859. It formed part of 5th Corps during the 1859 Italian campaign but saw no actual fighting. Next it was put on garrison duties in Saint-Malo, Laval and Saint-Brieuc before being sent as part of the French intervention in Mexico, taking part in the siege of Puebla and the battle of Aculcingo and winning the légion d’honneur at the latter. It returned to garrison duties in Vienne and was still there on the outbreak on the Franco-Prussian War in 1870 – it fought at Frœschwiller on 6 August and Sedan in September, whilst three of its companies were used to form the 44th Marching Regiment, which fought at Chilleurs, Ladon, Boiscommun, Neuville-aux-Bois and Maizières in the Loiret.

It spent the next forty years on garrison duties at Nîmes (1871–1873), Gap (1873), Embrun (1873), Briançon (1873), Montélimar (1874), Vienne (1875–1885), Lyon (1875–1885), Lyon (1885–1889), Romans (1885–1889), Lyon (1889–1893), Gap (1893–1896), Mont-Dauphin (1893–1896), Lyon (1896–1902), Bourgoin (1896–1902), Gap (1902–1905), Mont-Dauphin (1902–1905), Ubaye (1902–1905), Queyras (1902–1905),  Vienne (1905–1914) and Lyon (1905–1914). On mobilisation in 1914 it was based in Vienne and formed part of 55th Infantry Brigade, 28th Infantry Division and 14th Army Corps. It fought in the 1914 campaign in the Vosges and in March the following year its depot formed two companies of the new 414th Infantry Regiment. Captain Félix Fontan (1880–1914) was commanding its 12th Company in October 1914. Captain Jacques Lazare Olchanski (1891–1918) also served with the regiment. It fought in the 2nd Battle of Champagne in September and October 1915, at Verdun in 1916 and Chemin des Dames in 1917. In the battle of the Lys (1918) it had to hold mont Kemmel for two hours on 24 April under heavy artillery assault, then at 6am it was attacked with trench mortars by a Bavarian division.

It was mobilised in September 1939 at Lyon and Modane as 99th Alpine Infantry Regiment under the command of colonel Lacaze, forming part of 28th Alpine Infantry Division on the Italian border. It was then based in northern Alsace from November 1939 to April 1940 before being rested near Poligny (Jura) before finding itself back at Chemin des Dames from 18 May 1940, twenty-three years after previously fighting there. The regiment was disbanded a few weeks later, though some of its men took part in the Ain-Jura resistance, a battle honour which was later added to its colours. The regiment re-formed in December 1944 on the Alpine front, where it took part in the recapture of the col de Larche (22–26 April 1945).

In the post-war period it was sometimes a regiment and sometimes a battalion, providing men for the 25th Foot Chasseurs Battalion on its creation in June 1954 for the Tunisian campaign. In November 1954 it was converted into a Marching Regiment, the 99e BMIA, for the Algerian campaign – under that name it briefly also stayed in Morocco in August and September 1955. On 1 October it was renamed 15th Alpine Chasseurs Battalion, marking the end of the presence of a unit numbered 99 in north Africa. What was left of the former 99th in mainland France was nicknamed the "neuf-neuf" or the "régiment de Lyon" and found itself demoted to training recruits for Algeria and to supporting the 8th Military Region.

On 1 October 1968 it reverted to its original name of 99th Infantry Regiment and was detached from the mountain troops. In 1978 it formed a reserve regiment, the 299th Infantry Regiment. From 1982 to 1986 it provided several detachments for the fighting in Lebanon and from 1989 its 1st Combat Company was converted to special forces duties. Its last theatre of operations was Bosnia in 1992 and 1993 and the regiment was finally disbanded on 31 May 1997.

Colonels

1803–1814 (as 44th Light Infantry Regiment)
 unknown date : Antoine Alexandre Julienne de Bélair (killed whilst commanding the unit on 8 December 1810.)

1855–1997
 1863 : colonel Louis Albert Chagrin de Saint-Hilaire ;
 1870–1876 : colonel François Gouzil ;
 1898–1902 : colonel Charles Anglade ;
 1905–1908 : colonel Joseph Louis Alphonse Baret ;
 January – November 1914 : lieutenant-colonel Paul Joseph Hyacinthe Mignot (**) ;
 August 1914 : lieutenant-colonel Marty ;
 September 1914 : lieutenant-colonel Arbey ;
 1916–1923 : colonel Borne ;
 September 1939 : colonel Lacaze ;
 1977–1978 : colonel Leproust

 (*) Officers who later became brigadier generals  (**) Officers who later became divisional generals.

References

Bibliography (in French)
 Colonel (h) André Mudler Président de l’Amicale des anciens des 99e et 299e RI.
Historique du 99e régiment d'infanterie : 1914–1918, Bergerac, Impr. générale du sud-ouest, 1920, 40 p.

External links (in French)
 Historique du 99e régiment d'infanterie.
 Historique du 99e régiment d'infanterie 1914–1918.
 Amicale Royal deux-ponts / 99e et 299e RI.

Infantry regiments of France
Regiments of the French First Republic
Army units and formations of France in World War I
Army units and formations of France in World War II
Military units and formations established in 1855
Military units and formations disestablished in 1997
1855 establishments in France
1997 disestablishments in France
Algerian War